Quivira National Wildlife Refuge is located in south central Kansas near the town of Stafford. It lies mostly in northeastern Stafford County, but small parts extend into southwestern Rice and northwestern Reno Counties. Its proximity to the Central Flyway migration route and the salt marshes on the refuge combine to endow the refuge with a large variety of birds.  Many of these birds are uncommon in other parts of Kansas or even the central part of the continent.

On January 29, 2008, Quivira NWR and Cheyenne Bottoms Wildlife Area were jointly named as one of the 8 Wonders of Kansas. Quivira NWR is one of 29 places in the United States on the Ramsar list as a wetland of international importance.

Quivira - City of Gold
The name Quivira derives from a fabled Native American city of gold.  In 1541 Spanish conquistador Francisco Vásquez de Coronado led an expedition onto the Great Plains of Kansas searching for wealth. He spent a month with the Quivirans, the ancestors of the Wichita tribe, but returned to New Mexico without finding any gold.

Description

The Refuge is bisected by Rattlesnake Creek and has two shallow lakes, Big Salt Marsh and Little Salt Marsh, that have attracted migratory birds and animals for centuries. Twenty-one miles of canals have been constructed to create additional marshland. The wetlands have high salt levels.

The sand prairie has species from both the eastern Tallgrass prairie and the western Shortgrass prairie or steppe. About  of the Refuge is wooded with trees such as cottonwood, black locust, and eastern redcedar. Another  of Refuge land is farmed with winter wheat and milo. A portion of the crop is left in the fields for wildlife. Cattle are also grazed on part of the Refuge to simulate grazing by bison, which are no longer present. Bison grazing was a traditional component of the ecology of the region.

Two roads, one  and the other  in length, afford opportunities for wildlife viewing. A  nature trail passes through woodlands, grasslands, and across a marsh on an elevated boardwalk. Birdhouse Boulevard is a  wheel-chair accessible trail lined with birdhouses. A wildlife observation tower is located on the south side of Little Salt Marsh. Two photography blinds and a spotting scope aid in observing wildlife. A "Kid's Fishing Pond" is located near the Visitor Center which has interpretative displays. Fishing is permitted in the marshes. Bicycles and horses are permitted on established trails and roads. Boats of any kind are prohibited.

Wildlife Highlights

344 species of birds have been seen on Quivira National Wildlife Refuge.  Most are seasonal. The Christmas bird count in 2010 counted 43,548 birds of 95 species.  More than one-half of this total were snow geese many of which winter on the Refuge. Quivira also has mule and white-tail deer, raccoon, coyote, badger, skunk, two species of lizard, opossum, bobcat, red and swift foxes, six species of turtle, beaver, muskrat, porcupine, prairie dog, and wild turkey.

Spring and Summer
Shorebirds, pelicans, and gulls stop over at the refuge en route to their Spring nesting grounds.  Plovers, avocets, stilts, ibis, and endangered least terns nest on the refuge during the spring and summer. Whooping cranes stop over on their way north to nesting areas.

Fall 
800,000 geese and ducks pass through Quivira NWR en route to the Gulf Coast and Mexico. 
In addition, endangered whooping cranes occasionally visit the refuge en route to their wintering grounds in Texas.

Winter
Both bald and golden eagles spend the winter on the refuge.

Accidentals
These species have all been seen on rare occasions on the refuge:
Great flamingo
Surf scoter
Greater roadrunner
Pileated woodpecker
Roseate spoonbill

Images

See also
 List of Kansas state parks
 List of lakes, reservoirs, and dams in Kansas
 List of rivers of Kansas

References

External links
 U.S. Fish & Wildlife Service: official site
 
 Northern Prairie Wildlife Research Center
 bird list
 Jerry's Photo & Imaging Quivira Album

National Wildlife Refuges in Kansas
Recreational areas in Kansas
Ramsar sites in the United States
Protected areas of Rice County, Kansas
Protected areas of Reno County, Kansas
Protected areas of Stafford County, Kansas
Wetlands of Kansas
Landforms of Rice County, Kansas
Landforms of Reno County, Kansas
Landforms of Stafford County, Kansas